Jansha may refer to:

Jansha (or Janshah), from The Thousand and One Nights
Jansha (impact crater), named after the character.